Jean-Jacques Mirassou (born 1 November 1952 in Toulouse) is a former member of the Senate of France, representing the Haute-Garonne department from 2008 to 2014. He is a member of the Socialist Party.

References
Page on the Senate website 

1952 births
Living people
French Senators of the Fifth Republic
Socialist Party (France) politicians
Senators of Haute-Garonne
Politicians from Toulouse